Albocàsser or Albocácer in Spanish is a municipality in Castellón, Valencia, Spain.

It is located in the comarca of Alt Maestrat and has a population of 1439 inhabitants. The area is mountainous and very picturesque, especially during the almond and cherry tree blooming season.

Albocàsser is surrounded by mountain ranges; the Serra d'En Galceran is located SW of the town and the Montegordo to the north.

References

External links 

 Albocàsser Town Hall official webpage 
 Institut Valencià d'Estadística
 Portal de la Direcció General d'Administració Local de la Generalitat

Municipalities in the Province of Castellón
Alt Maestrat
Maestrazgo